The Deutsches Elektronen-Synchrotron (English German Electron Synchrotron), commonly referred to by the abbreviation DESY, is a national research center in Germany. It operates particle accelerators used to investigate the structure of matter, and conducts a broad spectrum of inter-disciplinary scientific research in three main areas: particle and high energy physics; photon science, and the development, construction and operation of particle accelerators. Its name refers to its first project, an electron synchrotron. DESY is publicly financed by the Federal Republic of Germany, the States of Germany, and the German Research Foundation (DFG). DESY is a member of the Helmholtz Association and operates at sites in Hamburg and Zeuthen.

Functions 
DESY's function is to conduct fundamental research. It specializes in particle accelerator development, construction and operation, particle physics research to explore the fundamental characteristics of matter and forces, including astroparticle physics, and photon science, research in surface physics, material science, chemistry, molecular biology, geophysics and medicine through the use of synchrotron radiation and free electron lasers.

In addition to operating its own large accelerator facilities, DESY also provides consulting services to research initiatives, institutes and universities. It is closely involved in major international projects such as the European X-Ray Free-Electron Laser, the Large Hadron Collider in Geneva, the IceCube Neutrino Observatory at the South Pole and the International Linear Collider.

Sites 
DESY operates in two locations. The primary location is in a suburb of Hamburg. In 1992, DESY expanded to a second site in Zeuthen near Berlin.

Hamburg 
The DESY Hamburg site is located in the suburb Bahrenfeld, west of the city. Most of DESY's research in high energy physics with elementary particles has been taking place here since 1960. The site is bounded by the ring of the former PETRA particle accelerator (since 2007 PETRA III, a synchrotron source) and part of the larger HERA (Hadron Elektron Ring Anlage) ring. Besides these accelerators there is also the free electron laser FLASH, and its offspring XFEL, which became operational in 2017. This project is meant to secure DESY's future place among the top research centers of the world.

Zeuthen 
Following German reunification, the DESY expanded to a second site : The Institute for High Energy Physics in Zeuthen, southeast of Berlin, was the high energy physics laboratory of the German Democratic Republic and belonged to the Academy of Sciences of the GDR. The institute was merged with DESY on 1 January 1992.

Employees and training 
DESY employs approximately 2000 people, of which 650 are scientists, working in the fields of accelerator operation, research and development. Staff is distributed on the two sites as follows:

Hamburg: 1800 employees, of which 600 are scientists
Zeuthen: 200 employees, of which 50 are scientists

DESY also trains more than 100 apprentices in commercial and technical vocations, and more than 700 undergraduates, graduates, and postdocs. DESY also hosts 3000 scientists from over 40 countries annually.

Budget and financing 
The research center has an annual budget around €192 million. Of this, approximately €173 million is budgeted for the Hamburg site and €19 million for Zeuthen. The primary source of financing is the Federal Ministry for Education and Research with 10% support coming from the German States of Hamburg and Brandenburg. Individual experiments and projects at the accelerators are financed by the participating German and foreign institutes, which in turn are often publicly financed. Special projects are funded by the German Research Foundation.

International co-operation 

2500 external scientists used  the DESY facilities for research with photons at PETRA III and FLASH in 2012.

International project HERA 
The construction of the accelerator HERA was one of the first  really internationally financed projects of this magnitude. Beforehand the construction of scientific facilities was always financed by the country in which it is located. Only the costs for the experiments were carried by the conducting national or foreign institutes. But due to the enormous scope of the HERA project many international facilities consented to already help with the construction.
All in all more than 45 institutes and 320 corporations participated with donations of money or materials in the construction of  the facility, more than 20% of the costs were carried by foreign institutions.

Following the example of HERA, many scientific projects of a large scale are financed jointly by several states. By now this model is established and international cooperation is pretty common with the construction of those facilities.

Particle accelerators, facilities and experiments 

DESY's accelerators were not built all at once, but rather were added one by one to meet the growing demand of the scientists for higher and higher energies to gain more insight into particle structures. In the course of the construction of new accelerators the older ones were converted to pre-accelerators or to sources for synchrotron radiation for laboratories with new research tasks (for example for HASYLAB).

Nowadays, after the shutdown of the accelerator HERA in 2007, DESY's most important facilities are the high intensity source for synchrotron radiation, PETRA III, the synchrotron-research lab HASYLAB, the free-electron laser FLASH (previously called VUV-FEL), the test facility for the European XFEL, and the European XFEL itself. The development of the different facilities will be described chronologically in the following section.

DESY 
The construction of the first particle accelerator DESY (Deutsches Elektronen Synchrotron, "German Electron Synchrotron") began in 1960. At that time it was the biggest facility of this kind and was able to accelerate electrons to 7.4 GeV. On 1 January 1964 the first electrons were accelerated in the synchrotron, starting research on quantum electrodynamics and the search for new elementary particles.

The international attention first focused on DESY in 1966 due to its contribution to the validation of quantum electrodynamics, which was achieved with results from the accelerator. In the following decade DESY established itself as a center of excellence for the development and operation of high-energy accelerators.

The synchrotron radiation, which comes up as a side effect, was first used in 1967 for absorption measurements. For the arising spectrum there had not been any conventional radiation sources beforehand. The European Molecular Biology Laboratory (EMBL) made use of the possibilities that arose with the new technology and in 1972 established a permanent branch at DESY with the aim of analyzing the structure of biological molecules by means of synchrotron radiation.

The electron-synchrotron DESY II and the proton-synchrotron DESY III were taken into operation  in 1987 and 1988 respectively as pre-accelerators for HERA.

DORIS III 
DORIS (Doppel-Ring-Speicher, "double-ring storage"), built between 1969 and 1974, was DESY's second circular accelerator and its first storage ring with a circumference of nearly 300 m. Constructed as an electron-positron storage ring, one could conduct collision-experiments with electrons and their antiparticles at energies of 3.5 GeV per beam. In 1978 the energy of the beams was raised to 5 GeV each.

With evidence of the "excited charmonium states" DORIS made an important contribution to the process of proving the existence of heavy quarks. In the same year there were the first tests of X-ray lithography at DESY, a procedure that was later refined to X-ray depth lithography.

In 1987 the ARGUS detector of the DORIS storage ring was the first place where the conversion of a B-meson into its antiparticle, the anti-B-meson was observed. From this one could conclude that it was possible, for the second-heaviest quark - the bottom-quark - under certain circumstances to convert into a different quark. One could also conclude from this that the unknown sixth quark - the top quark - had to possess a huge mass. The top quark was found eventually in 1995 at the Fermilab in the USA.

After the commissioning of HASYLAB in 1980 the synchrotron radiation, which was generated at DORIS as a byproduct, was used for research there. While in the beginning DORIS was used only  of the time as a radiation source, from 1993 on the storage-ring solely served that purpose under the name DORIS III. In order to achieve more intense and controllable radiation, DORIS was upgraded in 1984 with wigglers and undulators. By means of a special array of magnets the accelerated positrons could now be brought onto a slalom course. By this the intensity of the emitted synchrotron radiation was increased a hundredfold in comparison to conventional storage ring systems.

DORIS III provided 33 photon beamlines, where 44 instruments are operated in circulation. The overall beam time per year amounts to 8 to 10 months. It was finally shut down in favour of it successor PETRA III in the end of 2012.

OLYMPUS 
The former site of ARGUS in DORIS became the location of the OLYMPUS experiment, which began installation in 2010. OLYMPUS used the toroidal magnet and pair of drift chambers from the MIT-Bates BLAST experiment along with refurbished time-of-flight detectors and multiple luminosity monitoring systems. OLYMPUS measured the positron-proton to electron-proton cross section ratio to precisely determine the size of two-photon exchange in elastic ep scattering. Two-photon exchange may resolve the proton form factor discrepancy between recent measurements made using polarization techniques and ones using the Rosenbluth separation method. OLYMPUS took data in 2012 and 2013, and first results were published in 2017.

PETRA II 

PETRA (Positron-Elektron-Tandem-Ring-Anlage, "positron-electron tandem-ring facility") was built between 1975 and 1978. At the time of its construction it was the biggest storage ring of its kind and still is DESY's second largest synchrotron after HERA. PETRA originally served for research on elementary particles. The discovery of the gluon, the carrier particle of the strong nuclear force, in 1979 is counted as one of the biggest successes. PETRA can accelerate electrons and positrons to 19 GeV.

Research at PETRA lead to an intensified international use of the facilities at DESY. Scientists from China, France, Israel, the Netherlands, Norway, the United Kingdom and the USA participated in the first experiments at PETRA alongside many German colleagues.

In 1990 the facility was taken into operation under the name PETRA II as a pre-accelerator for protons and electrons/positrons for the new particle accelerator HERA. In March 1995, PETRA II was equipped with undulators to create greater amounts of synchrotron radiation with higher energies, especially in the X-ray part of the spectrum. Since then PETRA serves HASYLAB as a source of high-energy synchrotron radiation and for this purpose possesses three test experimental areas. Positrons are accelerated to up to 12 GeV nowadays.

PETRA III 
PETRA III is the third incarnation for the PETRA storage ring operating a regular user programme as the most brilliant storage ring based X-ray source worldwide since August 2010. The accelerator produces a particle energy of 6 GeV. There are currently three experimental halls (named after various famous scientists) which host up to 30 experiments simultaneously. The largest, named the Max von Laue Hall, has a concrete floor over 300m long that was poured as a single piece in order to limit vibrations.

HASYLAB 

The HASYLAB (Hamburger Synchrotronstrahlungslab or, "Hamburg Synchrotron radiation Laboratory") is used for research with synchrotron radiation at DESY. It was opened in 1980 with 15 experimental areas (today there are 42). The laboratory adjoins to the storage ring DORIS in order to be able to use the generated synchrotron radiation for its research. While in the beginning  DORIS served only one third of the time as a radiation source for HASYLAB, since 1993 all its running time is available for experiments with synchrotron radiation. On top of the 42 experimental areas DORIS provides, there are also three test experimental areas available for experiments with high-energy radiation generated with the storage ring PETRA.

After the upgrade of DORIS with the first wigglers, which produced far more intense radiation, the first Mössbauer spectrum acquired by means of synchrotron radiation was recorded at HASYLAB in 1984.

In 1985 the development of more advanced X-ray technology made it possible to bring to light the structure of the influenza virus. In the following year researchers at HASYLAB were the first to successfully make the attempt of exciting singular grid oscillations in solid bodies. Thus it was possible to conduct analyses of elastic materials, which were possible prior to this only with nuclear reactors via neutron scattering.

In 1987 the workgroup for structural molecular biology of the Max Planck Society founded a permanent branch at HASYLAB. It uses synchrotron radiation to study the structure of ribosomes.

Nowadays many national and foreign groups of researchers conduct their experiments at HASYLAB: All in all 1900 scientists participate in the work. On the whole the spectrum of the research ranges from fundamental research to experiments in physics, material science, chemistry, molecular biology, geology and medicine to industrial cooperations.

One example is OSRAM, which  since recently uses HASYLAB to study the filaments of their light bulbs. The gained insights helped to notably increase the life span of the lamps in certain fields of application.

In addition researchers at HASYLAB analysed among other things minuscule impurities in silicon for computer chips, the way catalysators work, the microscopic properties of materials and the structure of protein molecules.

HERA 

HERA (Hadron-Elektron-Ring-Anlage, "Hadron Electron Ring Facility") was DESY's largest synchrotron and storage ring, with a circumference of 6336 metres. The construction of the subterranean facility began in 1984 and was an international task: In addition to Germany, 11 further countries participated in the development of HERA. The accelerator began operation on 8 November 1990 and the first two experiments started taking data in 1992. HERA was mainly used to study the structure of protons and the properties of quarks. It was closed on 30 June 2007.

HERA was the only accelerator in the world that was able to collide protons with either electrons or positrons. To make this possible, HERA used mainly superconducting magnets, which was also a world first. At HERA, it was possible to study the structure of protons up to 30 times more accurately than before. The resolution covered structures 1/1000 of the proton in size. In the years to come, there were made many discoveries concerning the composition of protons from quarks and gluons.

HERA's tunnels run 10 to 25 metres below ground level and have an inner diameter of 5.2 metres. For the construction, the same technology was used as for the construction of subway tunnels. Two circular particle accelerators run inside the tube. One accelerated electrons to energies of 27.5 GeV, the other one protons to energies of 920 GeV in the opposite direction. Both beams completed their circle nearly at the speed of light, making approximately 47 000 revolutions per second.

At two places of the ring the electron and the proton beam could be brought to collision. In the process, electrons or positrons are scattered at the constituents of the protons, the quarks. The products of these particle collisions, the scattered lepton and the quarks, which are produced by the fragmentation of the proton, were registered in huge detectors. In addition to the two collision zones, there are two more interaction zones. All four zones are placed in big subterranean halls. A different international group of researchers were at work in each hall. These groups developed, constructed and run house-high, complex measurement devices in many years of cooperative work and evaluate enormous amounts of data.

The experiments in the four halls will be presented in the following section:

H1 

H1 is a universal detector for the collision of electrons and protons and was located in DESY's HERA-Hall North. It had been active since 1992, measured 12 m × 10 m × 15 m and weighed 2,800 tons.

It was designed for the decryption of the inner structure of the proton, the exploration of the strong interaction as well as the search for new kinds of matter and unexpected phenomena in particle physics.

ZEUS 

ZEUS is like H1 a detector for electron-proton collisions and was located in HERA-Hall South. Built in 1992, it measured 12 m × 11 m × 20 m and weighs 3600 tons.

Its tasks resemble H1's.

HERA-B 

HERA-B was an experiment in HERA-Hall West which collected data from 1999 to February 2003. By using HERA's proton beam, researchers at HERA-B conducted experiments on heavy quarks. It measured 8 m × 20 m × 9 m and weighed 1 000 tons.

HERMES 

The HERMES experiment in HERA-Hall East was taken into operation in 1995. HERA's longitudinally polarised electron beam was used for the exploration of the spin structure of nucleons. For this purpose the electrons were scattered at energies of 27.5 GeV at an internal gas target. This target and the detector itself were designed especially with a view to spin polarised physics. It measured 3.5 m × 8 m × 5 m and weighed 400 tons.

FLASH 
FLASH (Free-electron -LASer in Hamburg) is a superconducting linear accelerator with a free electron laser for radiation in the vacuum-ultraviolet and soft X-ray range of the spectrum. It originated from the TTF (TESLA Test Facility), which was built in 1997 to test the technology that was to be used in the planned linear collider TESLA, a project which was replaced by the ILC (International Linear Collider). For this purpose the TTF was enlarged from 100 m to 260 m.

At FLASH technology for the European XFEL is tested as well as for the ILC. Five test experimental areas have been in use since the commissioning of the facility in 2004.

European XFEL

The European X-ray free electron laser (European XFEL) is the world's largest and brightest X-ray laser. It is a European project in collaboration with DESY. In operation since 2017. The 3.4 km long tunnel starts in the DESY campus in Hamburg and goes westward to Schenefeld where the XFEL campus is situated. The tunnel contains a 2.1 km long superconducting linear accelerator where electrons are accelerated to an energy of up to 17.5 GeV. It produces extremely short (about 10 to 100 fs) and powerful X-ray flashes that have many applications in chemistry, biology and material science.

Smaller accelerators 
In addition to the larger ones, there are also several smaller particle accelerators which serve mostly as pre-accelerators for PETRA and HERA. Among these are the linear accelerators LINAC I (operated from 1964 to 1991 for electrons), LINAC II (operated since 1969 for positrons) and LINAC III (operated since 1988 as a pre-accelerator for protons for HERA).

Plans for the future 
DESY is involved in the project International Linear Collider (ILC). This project consists of a 30-kilometer-long linear accelerator. An international consortium decided to build it with the technology originally developed for the TESLA project. In 2013, the Kitakami mountains of southern Iwate were chosen as a candidate site, and cost sharing and other logistics-related discussions are currently underway.

References

External links

Buildings and structures in Altona, Hamburg
Education in Hamburg
Free-electron lasers
Organisations based in Hamburg
Particle physics facilities
Physics in Germany
Physics institutes
Research institutes in Germany
Synchrotron radiation facilities